Copicerus irroratus is a species of delphacid planthopper in the family Delphacidae. It is found in the Caribbean, Central America, North America, and South America.

Subspecies
These two subspecies belong to the species Copicerus irroratus:
 Copicerus irroratus irroratus Swartz, 1802 i g
 Copicerus irroratus thoracicus (Guérin-Méneville, 1856) i c g
Data sources: i = ITIS, c = Catalogue of Life, g = GBIF, b = Bugguide.net

References

Articles created by Qbugbot
Insects described in 1802
Asiracinae